Edcel Castelar Lagman Sr. (born May 1, 1942) is a Filipino human rights lawyer and politician from the province of Albay. He was elected as a member of the House in 1987 up to the present. He served as Minority Floor Leader of the House of Representatives of the Philippines until 2012, when he resigned the office. Lagman is one of the key Liberal Party figures in the House of Representatives, having supported the Reproductive Health Bill (who he principally authored), the SOGIE Equality Bill, the Free Tertiary Education Act, the Anti-Dynasty Bill, and the Freedom of Information Bill. He is also the principal author of the Divorce Bill, the Human Rights Defenders Bill, the Prevention of Teenage Pregnancy Bill, and the Anti-Child Marriage Bill.

Lagman was instrumental to the abolition of the death penalty in the Philippines in 2006 and continues to oppose proposals to reinstate capital punishment in the country. Lagman is also the principal author of a triumvirate of human rights laws, namely the Anti-Torture Act of 2009 (R.A. 9745), the Anti-Enforced or Involuntary Disappearance Act of 2012 (R.A. 10353), and the Human Rights Victims Reparation and Recognition Act of 2013 (R.A. 10368).

Education
Lagman has degrees in political science (cum laude) from the University of the Philippines Diliman where he became a member of the Alpha Phi Beta fraternity. He eventually finished his Bachelor of Laws at the University of the Philippines College of Law.

Political life
Lagman has been elected to a total of eight terms as a Member of the House of Representatives, representing the 1st district of Albay. He first served from 1987 to 1998, and then from 2004 to 2013, and from 2016 to the present. His daughter Krisel represented the district from 1998 to 2004 and his son Edcel Jr. from 2013 to 2016. Lagman also ran for senator in 1998 under the Laban ng Makabayang Masang Pilipino coalition and for representative of the 4th district of Quezon City in 2001 but lost in both occasions.
 
Lagman was a member of Lakas-CMD and is the main proponent of the Reproductive Health Bill. He is now a member of the Liberal Party, of which he is the party president since 2022, and is one of the leading opposition members of the House of Representatives.

Personal life
Lagman is the elder brother of Filemon "Popoy" Lagman, the founder of the Partido ng Manggagawa, Alex Boncayao Brigade, and who was assassinated in 2001. Another brother, Hermon, was a political activist who disappeared during the martial law government of President Ferdinand Marcos. Lagman is married to Maria Cielo Lagman (née Burce) and has seven children: Krisel, Edcel Greco, Larah, Mahar, Mark, Karina and Andre. His son Edcel Lagman Jr. is the incumbent Governor of Albay.

References

 

20th-century Filipino lawyers
People from Albay
Kapampangan people
University of the Philippines Diliman alumni
1942 births
Bicolano politicians
Living people
Bicolano people
Lakas–CMD (1991) politicians
Lakas–CMD politicians
Members of the House of Representatives of the Philippines from Albay
Minority leaders of the House of Representatives of the Philippines